Daniel Clyne (28 December 1879 – 28 August 1965) was an Australian politician. He was a member of the New South Wales Legislative Assembly  from  1927 until 1956 and, variously, a  member of the Labor Party (ALP) and  Lang Labor. He was the Speaker of the New South Wales Legislative Assembly between 1941 and 1947.

Clyne was born in Bathurst. He was the son of a farmer,  was  educated to elementary level at convent schools and from age 14 worked as a fettler for the New South Wales Government Railways. As an official in the Australian Railways Union he was dismissed for taking part in the 1917 general strike.  He  subsequently advanced in the Labor movement as an official of the Storemen and Packers' Union. At the 1927 state election, Clyne was elected to the New South Wales Parliament as the Labor member for the new seat of King. He retained the seat for the next 9 elections during a stormy period in ALP history (see Lang Labor) and retired at the 1956 state election. With the election of the Labor government of William McKell in 1941, Clyne was elected unanimously by the Legislative Assembly as Speaker. He maintained this position for 6 years and the parliamentary web site states that he was: "impartial in his rulings and developed a reputation for treating members with great fairness".

References

 

1879 births
1965 deaths
Members of the New South Wales Legislative Assembly
Speakers of the New South Wales Legislative Assembly
Australian trade unionists
Australian Labor Party members of the Parliament of New South Wales